Look Away! is the title of a recording by Doc Watson and Merle Watson, released in 1978.

Look Away! is out-of-print and was re-issued on CD in 2002 by Southern Music packaged with Lonesome Road!.

Reception

Writing for Allmusic, music critic Mark Allan wrote of the album "No album by this wonderful picker and his equally adept son could be without merit, although the material is not as consistently strong as they deserve."

Track listing
 "Florida Blues" (Traditional) – 1:45
 "Don't Think Twice, It's All Right" (Bob Dylan) – 2:47
 "My Love Come Rolling Down" (Eric Von Schmidt) – 3:29
 "Gypsy Davie" (Traditional) – 3:25
 "'Rangement Blues" (Traditional) – 2:51 
 "You Two-Timed Me One Time Too Often" (Jenny Lou Carson) – 2:06
 "Blues in My Mind" (Fred Rose) – 2:27
 "It's a Crazy World" (Mac McAnally) – 2:41
 "Under the Double Eagle" (Traditional) – 2:26
 "God Holds the Future" (Traditional) – 2:53
 "Dixie" (Traditional) – 1:35
Additional tracks on the Southern Music release:
 "New Born King" – 3:01
 "Peace in the Valley" (Thomas A. Dorsey) – 3:02

Personnel
Doc Watson – vocals, guitar, harmonica
Merle Watson – guitar, dobro
T. Michael Coleman – bass, background vocals
Johnny Gimble – fiddle
Gene Scrivenor – harmonica
Jim Isbell – drums, percussion
Marcia Routh – background vocals
Lisa Silver – background vocals
Pebble Daniel – background vocals

References

External links
 Doc Watson discography

1978 albums
Doc Watson albums
United Artists Records albums